The Antichrist is a book by the philosopher Friedrich Nietzsche, originally published in 1895. Although it was written in 1888, its content made Franz Overbeck and Heinrich Köselitz delay its publication, along with Ecce Homo. The German title can be translated into English as either The Anti-Christ or The Anti-Christian, depending on how the German word Christ is translated.

Content

Preface
Nietzsche claims in the preface to have written the book for a very limited readership. To understand the book, he asserts that the reader "must be honest in intellectual matters to the point of hardness to so much as endure my seriousness, my passion." The reader should be above politics and nationalism. Also, the usefulness or harmfulness of truth should not be a concern. Characteristics such as "[s]trength which prefers questions for which no one today is sufficiently daring; courage for the forbidden" are also needed. He disregards all other readers:Very well, then! of that sort only are my readers, my true readers, my readers foreordained: of what account are the rest?—The rest are merely humanity.—One must make one's self superior to humanity, in power, in loftiness of soul,—in contempt.

Decadent values
In section 1, Nietzsche expresses his dissatisfaction with modernity, listing his dislikes for the contemporary "lazy peace", "cowardly compromise", "tolerance" and "resignation". This relates to Arthur Schopenhauer's claim that knowledge of the inner nature of the world and life results in "perfect resignation, which is the innermost spirit of Christianity."

Nietzsche introduces his concept of will to power in § 2, using its relation to define notions of good, bad and happiness: What is good?—Whatever augments the feeling of power, the will to power, power itself, in man. What is evil?—Whatever springs from weakness. What is happiness?—The feeling that power increases—that resistance is overcome.Nietzsche follows this passage with provocative and shocking language:The weak and the botched shall perish: first principle of our charity. And one should help them to it. What is more harmful than any vice?—Practical sympathy for the botched and the weak—Christianity....This is an example of Nietzsche's reaction against Schopenhauer, who had based all morality on compassion. Nietzsche, on the contrary, praises "virtue free of moralic acid".

Nietzsche goes on to say that mankind, out of fear, has bred a weak, sick type of human. He blames Christianity for demonizing strong, higher humans. Pascal, he claims, was an intellectually strong man who was depraved by Christianity's teaching of original sin.

Mankind, according to Nietzsche, is corrupt and its highest values are depraved. He asserts that "all the values in which mankind at present summarizes its highest desiderata are decadence values". Mankind is depraved because it has lost its instincts and prefers what is harmful to it: I consider life itself instinct for growth, for durability, for accumulation of forces, for power: where the will to power is lacking there is decline.Depravity results because "nihilistic values dominate under the holiest names".

Christian pity
Christianity, as a religion of peace, is despised by Nietzsche. According to Nietzsche's account, pity has a depressive effect, loss of vitality and strength, and is harmful to life. It also preserves that which should naturally be destroyed. For a noble morality, pity is a weakness, but for Christianity, it is a virtue. 

In Schopenhauer's philosophy, which Nietzsche sees as the most nihilistic and opposed to life, pity is the highest virtue of all. But, for Nietzsche:[I]n the role of protector of the miserable, it is a prime agent in the promotion of décadence—pity persuades to extinction.... Of course, one doesn't say "extinction": one says "the other world," or "God," or "the true life," or Nirvana, salvation, blessedness.... This innocent rhetoric, from the realm of religious-ethical balderdash, appears a good deal less innocent when one reflects upon the tendency that it conceals beneath sublime words: the tendency to destroy life. Schopenhauer was hostile to life: that is why pity appeared to him as a virtue.He goes on further, mentioning that the moderns Leo Tolstoy and Richard Wagner adopted Schopenhauer's viewpoint. Aristotle, who lived in 384–322 BC, on the other hand, recognized the unhealthiness of pity and prescribed tragedy as a purgative.

Theologians, priests, and philosophers
Theology and philosophy, practiced by priests and idealists, are antithetical to reality and actuality. They are supposed to represent a high, pure and superior spirit that is above and has "benevolent contempt for the 'understanding', the 'senses', 'honors', 'good living' and 'science'." To Nietzsche, however, "[t]he pure soul is a pure lie," as he calls the priest a "professional denier, calumniator and poisoner of life,... [an] obvious attorney of mere emptiness" who stands truth upside down on its head. 

Theologians are placed by Nietzsche in the same class as priests, defining the faith that they foster as "closing one's eyes upon one's self once for all, to avoid suffering the sight of incurable falsehood." Seeing falsely is then valued as the highest morality. This reversal of values is considered, by Nietzsche, to be harmful to life. When the theologians seek political power, "the will to make an end, the nihilistic will exerts that power." 

In his native Germany, philosophy is corrupt because it is theological. Nietzsche points to Immanuel Kant, who supported theological ideals by his discussions of the concepts of "true world" and "morality as the essence of the world." Kant's sceptical procedure was to show that these concepts could not be refuted, even though they could not be proven. Nietzsche is especially critical of Kant's 'categorical imperative' as it was not the result of a personal necessity and choice. Its origin from concepts and logic was decadent because it was not a product of life, growth, self–preservation, and pleasure. Kant's practical reason was an attempt to give scientific legitimacy to his lack of intellectual conscience:He deliberately invented a variety of reasons for use on occasions when it was desirable not to trouble with reason—that is, when morality, when the sublime command 'thou shalt,' was heard.Kant's self–deceptive fraudulence is a result of the influence of priestly theology on his philosophy.

Scientific method
Nietzsche considers a free spirit to be the embodiment of a transvaluation of all values. Nietzsche claims that, prior to his time, the scientific method of searching for truth and knowledge was met with scorn and derision. A quiet, cautious, modest manner was seen with contempt. Our present modesty compels us to recognize man's derivation from animals, not divinities. Also, we know that man is not superior to other animals. By reducing man to a mere machine, devoid of free will, we have learned much about his physiology. Will is now known to be a necessary reaction to a stimulus. Consciousness and spirit derive from instinct.

Christian God
Nietzsche claims that the Christian religion and its morality are based on imaginary fictions. However, "the whole of that fictitious world has its sources in hatred of the natural (—the real!—)." Such hatred results from the decadence of Christianity, which is reflected by the Christian conception of God. If Christians were naturally strong and confident, they would have a God who is destructive as well as good. A God who counsels love of enemy, as well as of friend, is a God of a people who feel themselves as perishing and without hope. Weak, decadent, and sick people, whose will to power has declined, will give themselves a God who is purely good, according to Nietzsche. They will then attribute evil and deviltry to their masters' God. 

Metaphysicians have eliminated the attributes of virile (männliche) virtues, such as strength, bravery, and pride, from the concept of God. As a result, it deteriorated into an insubstantial ideal, pure spirit, Absolute, or thing in itself. 

Nietzsche opposes the Christian concept of God because:God degenerated into the contradiction of life. Instead of being its transfiguration and eternal Yea!  In him war is declared on life, on nature, on the will to live! God becomes the formula for every slander upon the "here and now," and for every lie about the "beyond"! Recalling Schopenhauer's description of the denial of the will to live and the subsequent empty nothingness, Nietzsche proclaims of the Christian God that "[i]n him nothingness is deified, and the will to nothingness is made holy!..."

Nietzsche criticizes the "strong races of northern Europe" for accepting the Christian God and not creating a new god of their own: "Two thousand years have come and gone—and not a single new god!" He maintains that the traditional "pitiful god of Christian monotono-theism" supports "all the instincts of décadence, all the cowardices and wearinesses of the soul find their sanction!"

Buddhism vs Christianity
Although he considers both Christianity and Buddhism to be nihilistic, decadent religions, Nietzsche considers the latter to be more realistic as it poses objective problems and does not use the concept of God. Nietzsche believes that, in all of religious history, Buddhism is the only positivistic religion as it struggles against actual suffering, which is experienced as fact or illusion (i.e., the concept of maya) in various Buddhist traditions. Christianity, by contrast, struggles against sin, while suggesting that suffering can have a redemptive quality.

Nietzsche claims that Buddhism is "beyond good and evil" because it has developed past the "self-deception that lies in moral concepts." Buddha created the religion to assist individuals in ridding themselves of the suffering of life: "Cheerfulness, quiet and the absence of desire are the chief desiderata, and they are attained." Buddhism has its roots in higher and also learned classes of people, whereas Christianity was the religion of the lowest classes, Nietzsche writes. He also believes that Christianity had conquered Barbarians by making them sick. Buddhism objectively claims "I suffer," while Christianity interprets suffering in relation to sin. Buddhism is too positivistic and truthful to have advocated the Christian virtues of faith, hope, and charity. Nietzsche refers to such virtues as the three Christian shrewdnesses: faith and belief are opposed to reason, knowledge, and inquiry. To Nietzsche, hope in the Beyond sustains the unhappy multitudes.

Origin of Christianity

Jewish priesthood
Jewish, and subsequently—to a greater degree—Christian, priests survived and attained power by siding with decadents, Nietzsche claims. They turned against the natural world. Their "instincts of ressentiment" against those who were well–constituted led them to "invent an other world in which the acceptance of life appeared as the most evil and abominable thing imaginable." 

To survive, the Jewish priests made use of the decadents and their large population. The Jews were not decadents, themselves—they are the "very opposite." Rather, according to Nietzsche, they have "the most powerful national will to live, that has ever appeared on earth." However, "they have simply been forced into appearing" as decadents, to "put themselves at the head of all décadent movements (—for example, the Christianity of Paul—), and so make of them something stronger than any party frankly saying Yes to life."

Five stages of denaturalizing values
Israel's Yahweh/Jahveh "was an expression of its consciousness of power, its joy in itself, its hopes for itself." Because he is their God, they considered him to be the God of justice. The Jews affirmed themselves, realized their own power, and had a good conscience. Even after internal anarchy and Assyrian invasions weakened Israel, it retained its worship of God as a king who is both soldier and judge.
Concept of God is falsified: Yahweh became a demanding god. "Jahveh, the god of "justice"—he is in accord with Israel no more, he no longer vizualizes the national egoism."
Concept of morality is falsified: morality is no longer an expression of life and growth. Rather, it opposes life by presenting wellbeing as a dangerous temptation.  The public notion of this God becomes weaponized by clerical agitators, who "interpret all happiness as a reward and all unhappiness as a punishment for obedience or disobedience to him, for 'sin'"
History of Israel is falsified: The great epoch becomes an epoch of decay. "the Exile, with its long series of misfortunes, was transformed into a punishment for that great age—during which priests had not yet come into existence." The past is translated into religious terms; it was a record of guilt, punishment, piety, and reward in relation to Yahweh. A moral world order is established which assigns value to actions that obey the will of God (and which claims that this general will, i.e. the right way of life for everyone, is eternal and unchanging). Priests teach that "the ruling power of the will of God, expressed as punishment and reward according to the degree of obedience, is demonstrated in the destiny of a nation, of an individual."
God's will is revealed in the holy scripture: the sacred book formulates the will of God and specifies what is to be given to the priests. The priest sanctifies and bestows all value: disobedience of God (the priest) is 'sin;' subjection to God (the priest) is redemption. Priests use 'sin' to gain and hold power.From this time forward things were so arranged that the priest became indispensable everywhere; at all the great natural events of life, at birth, at marriage, in sickness, at death, not to say at the sacrifice' (that is, at meal-times), the holy parasite put in his appearance, and proceeded to denaturize it.

Revolt against Jewish priesthood
The Jewish church opposed and negated nature, reality, and the world as being sinful and unholy. Christianity then negated the Jewish church and its holy, chosen people, according to Nietzsche.The phenomenon is of the first order of importance: the small insurrectionary movement which took the name of Jesus of Nazareth is simply the Jewish instinct redivivus—in other words, it is the priestly instinct come to such a pass that it can no longer endure the priest as a fact; it is the discovery of a state of existence even more fantastic than any before it, of a vision of life even more unreal than that necessary to an ecclesiastical organization.The Jewish church and the Jewish nation received this rebellion as a threat to its existence.This saintly anarchist, who aroused the people of the abyss, the outcasts and "sinners," the Chandala of Judaism, to rise in revolt against the established order of things...this man was certainly a political criminal.... This is what brought him to the cross.... He died for his own sins...

The Redeemer type
Nietzsche criticizes Ernest Renan's attribution of the concepts genius and hero to Jesus. Nietzsche thinks that the word idiot best describes Jesus. According to Walter Kaufmann, Nietzsche might have been referring to the naïve protagonist of Dostoevsky's The Idiot. 

With an antipathy toward the material world, Jesus has "a feeling of being at home in a world in which no sort of reality survives, a merely 'inner' world, a 'true' world, an 'eternal' world.... 'The Kingdom of God is within you'." Nietzsche believes that the redeemer type is determined by a morbid intolerance of pain. Extreme sensitivity results in avoidance of the world, and any feeling of resistance to the world is experienced as pain. Even evil is therefore not resisted: "The fear of pain, even of infinitely slight pain—the end of this can be nothing save a religion of love...." Jesus was a distorted version of the redeemer type. The first disciples, in their Gospels, described him as having Old-Testament characteristics such as prophet, messiah, miracle worker, moral preacher, and so on.

Dostoevsky could have revealed his sickliness and childishness. According to Jesus, "the kingdom of heaven belongs to children." Everyone has an equal right to become a child of God. His spirituality is infantile, a result of delayed puberty. Jesus does not resist or contend with the world because he doesn't recognize the importance of the world. His life is its own kingdom of God at every moment. Early Christians used Semitic concepts to express his teaching, but his anti-realism could just as easily have been a characteristic of Taoism or Hinduism.

Nietzsche asserts that the psychological reality of redemption was a "new way of life, not a new faith." It is "[t]he deep instinct which prompts the Christian how to live so that he will feel that he is 'in heaven'." The Christian is known by his acts. He offers no resistance to evil, He has no anger and wants no revenge. Blessedness is not promised on conditions, as in Judaism. The Gospel's glad tidings are that there is no distinction between God and man. There is no Judaic concern for sin, prayers, rituals, forgiveness, repentance, guilt, punishment, or faith:[H]e knew that it was only by a way of life that one could feel one's self 'divine,' 'blessed,' 'evangelical,' a 'child of God.' Not by 'repentance,' not by 'prayer and forgiveness' is the way to God: only the Gospel way leads to God—it is itself 'God!'There were two worlds for the teacher of the Gospel's glad tidings: the real, true world is an inner experience of the heart in which all things are blessedly transfigured (verklärung), eternalized, and perfected. The apparent world, however, is only a collection of psychological symbols, signs, and metaphors. These symbols are expressed in terms of space, time, history, and nature. Examples of these mere symbols are the concepts of "God as a person," "the son of man," "the hour of death," and "the kingdom of heaven." Jesus did not want to redeem anyone. He wanted to show how to live. His legacy was his bearing and behavior. He did not resist evildoers. He loved evildoers. Nietzsche has Jesus tell the thief on the cross that he is in Paradise now if he recognizes the divinity of Jesus' comportment.

History of Christianity

Opposite development
Nietzsche sees a world–historical irony in the way that the Christian Church developed in antithetical opposition to the Evangel and the Gospel of early Christianity. The fable of Christ as miracle worker and redeemer is not the origin of Christianity. The beginnings of Christianity is not in the "crude fable of the wonder-worker and Saviour." Rather, such is a "progressively clumsier misunderstanding of an original symbolism:" the death on the cross. 

Christianity became more diseased, base, morbid, vulgar, low, barbaric and crude: A sickly barbarism finally lifts itself to power as the church—the church, that incarnation of deadly hostility to all honesty, to all loftiness of soul, to all discipline of the spirit, to all spontaneous and kindly humanity.—Christian values—noble values.Nietzsche expresses contempt for his contemporaries because they mendaciously call themselves Christians but do not act like true Christians. Modern people act with worldly egoism, pride, and will to power in opposition to Christianity's denial of the world. Nietzsche considers this falseness to be indecent. Unlike past ages, his contemporaries know that sham and unnatural concepts such as "God," "moral world–order," "sinner," "Redeemer," "free will," "beyond," "Last Judgment," and "immortal soul" are consciously employed to provide power to the church and its priests. "The very word 'Christianity' is a misunderstanding," Nietzsche explains:[A]t bottom there was only one Christian, and he died on the cross.... It is an error amounting to nonsensicality to see in "faith", and particularly in faith in salvation through Christ, the distinguishing mark of the Christian: only the Christian way of life, the life lived by him who died on the cross, is ChristianThereafter, the opposite kind of life was called Christian. Belief in redemption through Christ is not originally Christian. Genuine, original, primitive Christianity is "[n]ot faith, but acts; above all, an avoidance of acts, a different state of being." Jesus wanted his death on the cross to be an example of how a person can be free from resentment, revenge, and rebellion. The disciples, however, wanted revenge against the Jewish ruling class and high priests who had delivered him to Pilate. They elevated Jesus into being the Messiah and Son of God and promised future judgment and punishment in the kingdom of God. This was in opposition to Jesus' doctrine that everyone could be a child of God and experience Heaven in their present lives by acting in a gentle, loving manner.

Paul and the promise of eternal life

The apostles claimed that Jesus' death was a sacrifice of an innocent man for the sins of the guilty. But "Jesus him self had done away with the very concept of 'guilt,' he denied that there was any gulf fixed between God and man; he lived this unity between God and man, and that was precisely his 'glad tidings'" 

To claim that there is life after death, the apostles ignored Jesus' example of blessed living. Paul emphasizes the concept of immortality in First Corinthians 15:17, as Nietzsche explains:<blockquote>St. Paul...gave a logical quality to that conception, that indecent conception, in this way: If Christ did not rise from the dead, then all our faith is in vain!'—And at once there sprang from the Gospels the most contemptible of all unfulfillable promises, the shameless doctrine of personal immortality.... Paul even preached it as a reward....</blockquote>Paul used the promise of life after death as a way to seize tyrannical power over the masses of lower-class people. This changed Christianity from a peace movement that achieves actual happiness into a religion whose final judgment offers possible resurrection and eternal life. Paul falsified the history of Christianity, the history of Israel, and the history of mankind by making them all seem to be a preparation for the crucifixion. "The vast lie of personal immortality destroys all reason, all natural instinct—henceforth, everything in the instincts that is beneficial, that fosters life and that safeguards the future is a cause of suspicion." 

The 'meaning' of life is that there is no meaning to present life. One lives for life in the beyond. By offering immortal life after death to everyone, Christianity appealed to everyone's egoism. The laws of nature would be broken for the salvation of everyone. "And yet Christianity has to thank precisely this miserable flattery of personal vanity for its triumph—it was thus that it lured all the botched, the dissatisfied, the fallen upon evil days, the whole refuse and off-scouring of humanity to its side." 

This influenced politics and led to revolutions against aristocracies. Nietzsche claims that Paul's pretense of holiness and his use of priestly concepts were typically Jewish. Christianity separated itself from Judaism as though it was the chosen religion, "just as if the Christian were the meaning, the salt, the standard and even the last judgment of all the rest." 

Christianity then divided itself from the world by appropriation: "[L]ittle abortions of bigots and liars began to claim exclusive rights in the concepts of 'God,' 'the truth,' 'the light,' 'the spirit,' 'love,' 'wisdom' and 'life,' as if these things were synonyms of themselves." According to Nietzsche:The whole of Judaism appears in Christianity as the art of concocting holy lies, and there...the business comes to the stage of mastery. The Christian, that Ultima Ratio of lying, is the Jew all over again—he is threefold the Jew.... The Christian is simply a Jew of the "reformed" confession.

Gospel of resentment
Nietzsche asserts:The 'early Christian'—and also, I fear, the 'last Christian'...—is a rebel against all privilege by profound instinct—he lives and makes war for ever for 'equal rights.'... When a man proposes to represent, in his own person, the 'chosen of God'...then every other criterion, whether based upon honesty, upon intellect, upon manliness and pride, or upon beauty and freedom of the heart, becomes simply "worldly"—evil in itself. 

Against science
The Christian God is harmful and a crime against life. "The God that Paul invented for himself" is a negation of God. Christianity, in its opposition to reality, "'reduced to absurdity' 'the wisdom of this world' (especially the two great enemies of superstition, philology and medicine)." Nietzsche claims that Paul willed to ruin the 'wisdom of this world' and, in Jewish fashion, Paul gave the name of "God" and Torah to his own will. According to Nietzsche, the Old Testament, Genesis 3:5, chronicles the hellish anxiety of God, and thus the priests, in regards to science. 

Man tasted knowledge and created his own enemy; "science makes men godlike—it is all up with priests and gods when man becomes scientific!" Priests used the concepts of "sin," "guilt," and "punishment" to oppose knowledge, science, and the concepts of cause and effect. Sinful, suffering humans believe in supernatural agents. Such sinners are dependent on their priests for salvation, redemption, and forgiveness. "[T]he priest rules through the invention of sin."

Psychology of belief
Belief is "a sign of décadence, of a broken will to live." The Christian "proof by power" is that "[f]aith makes blessed: therefore it is true." However, blessedness is something that the priest merely promises, not demonstrated; "it hangs upon "faith" as a condition—one shall be blessed because one believes."

Blessedness—or, more technically, pleasure—can never be a proof of truth: "proof by 'pleasure' is a proof of 'pleasure'—nothing more; why in the world should it be assumed that true judgments give more pleasure than false ones...?" Nietzsche summarizes, "[f]aith makes blessed: therefore, it lies...."

Illness
Nietzsche alleges that "one is not "converted" to Christianity—one must first be sick enough for it." The decadent and sick types of people came to power through Christianity. From everywhere, the aggregate of the sick accumulated in Christianity and outnumbered the healthy. "The majority became master; democracy, with its Christian instincts, triumphed." The meaning of the God on the Cross is that "[e]verything that suffers, everything that hangs on the cross, is divine." Nietzsche continues: Since sickness is inherent in Christianity, it follows that the typically Christian state of "faith" must be a form of sickness too, and that all straight, straightforward and scientific paths to knowledge must be banned by the church as forbidden ways. Doubt is thus a sin from the start.Knowledge requires caution, intellectual moderation, discipline, and self–overcoming. Christianity, however, uses sick reasoning, like Martyrdom, to try to prove its truth. Christians think "that there must be something in a cause for which any one goes to his death." Nietzsche responds to this notion by quoting a passage from his own Zarathustra:Thus Spoke Zarathustra, Part II, "Of the Priests"

To Nietzsche, "the need of faith, of something unconditioned by yea or nay...is a need of weakness."

The Holy Lie and belief

Lying, or not wanting to see as one sees, is a trait of those who are devoted to a party or faction. Lying is used by all priests, be they pagan, Jewish, or Christian:[T]he right to lie and the shrewd dodge of 'revelation' belong to the general priestly type.... The 'law,' the 'will of God,' the 'holy book,' and 'inspiration'—all these things are merely words for the conditions under which the priest comes to power and with which he maintains his power... Christianity's lies are not holy. They serve "[o]nly bad ends...: the poisoning, the calumniation, the denial of life, the despising of the body, the degradation and self-contamination of man by the concept of sin." Contrarily, unlike any Bible, the Hindu 'Code of Manu'—or, manusmriti—lies for a good purpose: "by means of it the nobles, the philosophers and the warriors keep the whip-hand over the majority." It affirms life, well-being, and happiness. The purpose of the Christian 'Holy Lie', however, is bad; all of it "proceeds from weakness, from envy, from revenge." Thus, Nietzsche contends, "[t]he anarchist and the Christian have the same ancestry."

Christianity lied about guilt, punishment, and immortality to destroy imperium Romanum, an organization that was designed to promote life. Paul realized that a "world conflagration" might be lit; "how, with the symbol of 'God on the cross,' all secret Seditions, all the fruits of anarchistic intrigues in the empire, might be amalgamated into one immense power." Paul's revelation on the road to Damascus was that "he needed the belief in immortality in order to rob 'the world' of its value, that the concept of 'hell' would master Rome—that the notion of a 'beyond' is the death of life.... Nihilist and Christian: they rhyme in German, and they do more than rhyme."

Lost labor

Greece and Rome
Christianity deprived us of the benefits of Greco-Roman culture from which, over two thousand years ago, the scientific method was discovered. The Greeks and Romans "[overnight]...became merely a memory:"Instinctive nobility, taste, methodical inquiry, genius for organization and administration, faith in and the will to secure the future of man, a great yes to everything entering into the imperium Romanum and palpable to all the senses.... All overwhelmed in a night;...brought to shame by crafty, sneaking, invisible, anæmic vampires! Not conquered,—only sucked dry!... Hidden vengefulness, petty envy, became master!

Islam
Nietzsche poses the question of why Christianity had trampled down the culture of Islam; of Mohammedan civilization. "Because," Nietzsche explains, "it had to thank noble and manly instincts for its origin—because it said yes to life, even to the rare and refined luxuriousness of Moorish life!" The Crusades were "a higher form of piracy:"See also: Muslim settlement of Lucera.Intrinsically there should be no more choice between Islam and Christianity than there is between an Arab and a Jew. The decision is already reached; nobody remains at liberty to choose here. Either a man is a Chandala or he is not.... 'War to the knife with Rome! Peace and friendship with Islam!': this was the feeling, this was the act, of that great free spirit, that genius among German Emperors, Frederick II. What! must a German first be a genius, a free spirit, before he can feel decently? I can't make out how a German could ever feel Christian.

Renaissance
The European Renaissance of Greek and Roman values was "[t]he transvaluation of Christian values,—an attempt with all available means, all instincts and all the resources of genius to bring about a triumph of the opposite values, the more noble values." However, Martin Luther thought that the Pope was corrupt. Actually, the papacy was rid of corrupt Christianity:[T]he old corruption, the peccatum originale, Christianity itself, no longer occupied the papal chair! Instead there was life! Instead there was the triumph of life! Instead there was a great yea to all lofty, beautiful and daring things!... And Luther restored the church: he attacked it.

Condemnation
Nietzsche concludes his work with the insistence that Christianity "turned every value into worthlessness, and every truth into a lie, and every integrity into baseness of soul.... [I]t lives by distress; it creates distress to make itself immortal."

"To breed out of humanitas a self-contradiction, an art of self-pollution, a will to lie at any price, an aversion and contempt for all good and honest instincts," in Nietzsche's view, is the spirit of Christianity. With its parasitism; with "the beyond as the will to deny all reality," Nietzsche believes the "'humanitarianism' of Christianity" to be a conspiracy "against health, beauty, well-being, intellect, kindness of soul—against life itself." 

He considers it to be a curse and a corruption. While humanity "reckons time from the " when this "fatality" emerged—"from the first day of Christianity"—Nietzsche asks "[w]hy not rather from its last?" Nietzsche suggests that time be calculated from "today," the date of this book, whereby 'Year One' would begin on 30 September 1888—"The transvaluation of all values!"

Thoughts on Jesus

In his earlier works, Nietzsche did not distinguish the teachings of Jesus from historic Christianity. However, in late 1887 and early 1888, he analyzed Tolstoy's essay What I Believe. Nietzsche's view of Jesus in The Antichrist follows Tolstoy in separating Jesus from the Church and emphasizing the concept of "non-resistance," but uses it as a basis for his own development of the "psychology of the Savior".

Nietzsche does not demur of Jesus, conceding that he was the only one true Christian. He presents a Christ whose own inner life consisted of "wit, the blessedness of peace, of gentleness, the inability to be an enemy." 

Nietzsche heavily criticizes the organized institution of Christianity and its class of priests. Christ's evangelism consisted of the good news that the 'kingdom of God' is within you: "What is the meaning of 'Glad Tidings'?—The true life, the life eternal has been found—it is not merely promised, it is here, it is in you; it is the life that lies in love free from all retreats and exclusions," whereby sin is abolished and away from "all keeping of distances" between man and God. 

"What the 'glad tidings' tell us is simply that there are no more contradictions; the kingdom of heaven belongs to children" Nietzsche does, however explicitly, consider Jesus as a mortal, and, moreover, as ultimately misguided: the antithesis of a 'true hero,' whom he posits with his concept of a 'Dionysian hero.'

 Publication 

Title
The title is not a direct reference to the biblical 'Antichrist,' but is rather an attack on the "master–slave morality" and apathy of Western Christianity. Nietzsche's basic claim is that Christianity (as he saw it in the West) is a poisoner of western culture and perversion of the words of and practice of Jesus, the one, true 'Christian.' In this light, the provocative title mainly expresses Nietzsche's animus toward Christianity as such. In this book, Nietzsche is very critical of institutionalized religion and its Priest class, from which he himself was descended. The majority of the book is a systematic attack upon the interpretations of Christ's words by Saint Paul and those who followed him.

The German title, Der Antichrist, is ambiguous and open to two interpretations: the Antichrist, or the Anti-Christian.Kaufmann, Walter. 1974. Nietzsche: Philosopher, Psychologist, Antichrist (4th ed.). Princeton: Princeton University Press. pg. 7. However, its use within the work generally admits only an "Anti-Christian" meaning. H. L. Mencken's 1918 translation and R. J. Hollingdale's 1968 translation both title their editions as "The Anti-Christ;" and Walter Kaufmann uses "The Antichrist," while no major translation uses "The Anti-Christian." Kaufmann considers The Antichrist the more appropriate way to render the German: "[a] translation of the title as 'The Antichristian'...overlooks that Nietzsche plainly means to be as provocative as possible."

Nietzsche makes Polemics against Ernest Renan within The Anti-Christ, and Renan's 1873 L'antéchrist saw an "authorized German-language edition" published the same year under the title, Der Antichrist. It is possible that Nietzsche named his book the same as a way of "calling out" Renan.

Sanity
This book was written shortly before Nietzsche's infamous nervous breakdown. However, as one scholar notes, "the Antichrist is unrelievedly vituperative, and would indeed sound insane were it not informed in its polemic by a structure of analysis and a theory of morality and religion worked out elsewhere."

 Translated editions 

 1918. Der Antichrist (in English), translated by H. L. Mencken. New York: Alfred A. Knopf.
 1924. The Antichrist (2nd ed.), translated by H. L. Mencken (1918). New York: Alfred A. Knopf.
 1999. The Anti-Christ, translated by H. L. Mencken; see Sharp, 1999, .
 1976. The Antichrist, in The Portable Nietzsche, translated by W. Kaufmann. London: Penguin. .

Suppressed passages

"The word idiot"
Section 29 originally contains three words that were suppressed by Nietzsche's sister in 1895: "das Wort Idiot" or, "the word idiot." H. L. Mencken's English translation does not contain these words. However, in 1931, the words were reinstated by Josef Hofmiller. Likewise, English translations by Walter Kaufmann and R.J. Hollingdale also contain them. According to Kaufmann, Nietzsche was referring to Dostoevsky's book The Idiot and its naïve protagonist. The passage reads:

Christ's words to the thief on the cross
In § 35, Nietzsche wanted to convey the idea that, to Christ, Heaven is a subjective state of mind.
To accomplish this goal, Nietzsche parodied a passage from the New Testament, which the Nietzsche Archive, headed by Elisabeth Förster-Nietzsche, decided to suppress so that there would be no doubt as to the strict correctness of Nietzsche's use of the Bible.<ref group="lower-roman">From the English translation of The Antichrist as shown on The Nietzsche Channel: 

"Nietzsche refers to the conversion of one of the two thieves crucified with Jesus, which is only reported in the tale of suffering" by Luke (23: 39–43; cf. Matthew 27:44; Mark 15:31–32). "However, the words which Nietzsche puts into the mouth of the thief are those of the captain after Christ's death" (cf. Luke 23:47; Matthew. 27:54; Mark 15:39). "Perhaps the Nietzsche-Archive didn't want to see the 'cohesiveness of the Bible' disputed by Nietzsche, hence the suppression of this part" (cf. Hofmiller, Josef. November 1931. Nietzsche, 'Süddeutsche Monatshefte. p. 94ff).</ref> 

According to Nietzsche, one of the thieves, who was also being crucified, said, "This was truly a divine man, a child of God!" Nietzsche had Christ reply, "If you feel this, you are in Paradise, you are a child of God." In the Bible, only Luke related a dialogue between Christ and the thief in which the thief said, "This man has done nothing wrong" to which, Christ replies, "Today I tell you, you will be with me in Paradise." Nietzsche had the thief speaking the words that the centurion later spoke in Luke 23:47, Matthew 27:54, and Mark 15:39. In these passages, Christ was called the 'Son of God' by the soldier. The Nietzsche Archives' suppression was lifted in later editions and now appears exactly as Nietzsche wrote.

The full passage reads:

A young prince
In § 38, there is a reference to a young prince who professes to be a Christian but acts in a very worldly manner. The passage about this was suppressed to avoid comparison to Wilhelm II. According to Mazzino Montinari, this passage was never printed in any edition prepared by the Nietzsche Archive. However, it did appear in the pocketbook edition of 1906.

The full passage reads:

Anno Domini
Nietzsche, in § 62, criticizes the reckoning of time from Christ's birth (anno Domini). This passage was judged by Franz Overbeck and Heinrich Köselitz to be unworthy of publication. According to Mazzino Montinari, this passage was restored in the 1899 edition, appearing in all subsequent editions.

The full passage reads:

Decree against Christianity
Also suppressed was Nietzsche's "Decree against Christianity," which consists of seven propositions:

 Every type of anti-nature is depraved (e.g. original Sin).
 Participation in religion is an assassination attempt on public morality (e.g. Just war theory).
 Sacred (earthly) things which Christianity has deified should be eradicated (e.g. sacred sites and rituals).
 The Christian teaching on chastity is a public instigation to anti-nature (e.g. Christian modesty).
 The Christian priest is a chandala – he should be ostracized, starved for preferring discourse and declining food at a banquet (e.g. the sacrifice of fasting).
 This is the transvaluation of values in which the divine becomes criminal, etc.
 Christian religion (rather than Christian philosophy) is the ultimate evil (as explained above in this article).

References

Notes

Citations

Bibliography
 Danto, Arthur. 2005. Nietzsche as Philosopher: Expanded Edition, Columbia. .
 Kaufmann, Walter. 1974. Nietzsche: Philosopher, Psychologist, Antichrist. Princeton: Princeton University Press. .
 Nietzsche, Friedrich. [1889] 1991. The Twilight of the Idols and The Anti-Christ, translated by R. J. Hollingdale. London: Penguin Books. .
Schopenhauer, Arthur. [1840] 2005. On the Basis of Morality. Dover. .
 — [1818] 1969. The World as Will and Representation I. Dover. .
Sommer, Andreas Urs. 2000. Friedrich Nietzsche: Der Antichrist. Ein philosophisch-historischer Kommentar. Basel.  — the comprehensive standard commentary on The Antichrist – only available in German.

External links

 (H. L. Mencken translation and German original)

Antichrist, The
Alfred A. Knopf books
Anti-Christian sentiment in Europe
Antichrist, The
Books critical of Christianity